The 2013 MNC Cup was held from 21 November to 24 November 2013, hosted by Indonesia. This tournament is intended for players under the age of 23 years (maximum birth 1 January 1990), but each team can register three players aged over 23 years.

Participating teams 
Source:

Venues

Table and results 
All times are West Indonesian Time (WIB) – UTC+7.

Winner

Goalscorers
2 goals

  Andik Vermansyah
  Dendi Santoso
  Yandi Sofyan
  Khonesavanh Sihavong
  Ali Fasir

1 goal

  Alfin Tuasalamony
  Bayu Gatra
  Ramdhani Lestaluhu
  Roni Beroperay
  Phouthone Innalay
  Phoutthasay Khochalern
  Vilayout Sayyabounsou
  Akram Abdul Ghanee
  Ronald Conn

References

2013
2013 in Indonesian football